George Sutton may refer to:

Politicians and nobility
George Manners-Sutton (1751–1804), British politician
Lord George Manners-Sutton (1723–1783), born Lord George Manners, British nobleman and politician
Sir George Morris Sutton (1834–1913), Prime Minister of Natal, 1903–1905
Sir George Sutton, 1st Baronet, of Castle House (1869–1947), Sutton Baronet
Sir George Sutton, 1st Baronet, of Beckenham (1856–1934), Sutton Baronet

Sportspeople
George Sutton (boxer) (1922–1995), Welsh boxer
George Sutton (cricketer) (1887–1949), English cricketer
George H. Sutton (1870–1938), American, and handless, carom billiards player

Others
George Sutton (judge) (George Gerard Sutton) (1880–1955), South African judge
George Miksch Sutton (1898–1982), American ornithologist and bird artist
George Lowe Sutton (1872–1964), Australian agricultural scientist and breeder of wheat

See also